Emad Al-Sahabi  (born October 5, 1987) is a Saudi football player who plays for Al-Anwar a left-back.

References

1987 births
Living people
Saudi Arabian footballers
Al-Riyadh SC players
Al-Orobah FC players
Al-Shoulla FC players
Al Jandal Club players
Al-Anwar Club players
Place of birth missing (living people)
Saudi First Division League players
Saudi Professional League players
Saudi Second Division players
Saudi Third Division players
Association football fullbacks